Tympanophyllum is a genus of Southeast Asian bush-crickets in the tribe Phyllomimini within the subfamily Pseudophyllinae.  Species have been recorded from India, through Indo-China and Malesia to New Guinea. The genus was named in 1902.

Species
The Orthoptera Species File lists the following 2 subgenera:
Tympanophyllum (Anaprion) Uvarov, 1939
Tympanophyllum auriculatum Gorochov & Voltshenkova, 2002
Tympanophyllum citreum Gorochov & Voltshenkova, 2002
Tympanophyllum imperfectum (de Jong, 1939)
Tympanophyllum javanicum (Brunner von Wattenwyl, 1895)
Tympanophyllum maculiventris (Beier, 1954)
Tympanophyllum maximum (Rehn, 1906)
Tympanophyllum porrectum (Walker, 1870)
Tympanophyllum semivitreum (Serville, 1838)
Tympanophyllum virescens (Serville, 1838)
Tympanophyllum (Tympanophyllum) Krauss, 1902
Tympanophyllum arcufolium (Haan, 1842)– type species: locality near Padang, Sumatra (as Tympanoptera extraordinaria Brunner von Wattenwyl, 1895: locality Borneo)
Tympanophyllum atroterminatum (Brunner von Wattenwyl, 1895)
Tympanophyllum montanum Beier, 1954
Tympanophyllum timanthoides de Jong, 1939

Note: A binomial authority in parentheses indicates that the species was originally described in a genus other than Tympanophyllum.

References

External links
 Photos at iNaturalist
 Photo of T. maximum on Flickr

Pseudophyllinae
Tettigoniidae genera
Orthoptera of Asia